Kevin DeWayne Lee (born January 1, 1971) is a former American football wide receiver in the National Football League (NFL) and Arena Football League (AFL).

Lee played college football at Alabama and was drafted by the New England Patriots in the second round of the 1994 NFL Draft. He spent two seasons with the Patriots, appearing in seven games in 1995, and played in two games for the San Francisco 49ers in 1996. Lee also played in NFL Europe for the Rhein Fire, in the short-lived Regional Football League for the Mobile Admirals, and in the AFL for the Carolina Cobras.

References

1971 births
Living people
Sportspeople from Mobile, Alabama
Players of American football from Alabama
American football wide receivers
Alabama Crimson Tide football players
New England Patriots players
San Francisco 49ers players
Rhein Fire players
Carolina Cobras players
Regional Football League players